O'Shaughnessy's Boy is a 1935 film starring Wallace Beery and Jackie Cooper and directed by Richard Boleslawski. The picture was partly set in a circus. The cinematographer was James Wong Howe.

Plot summary

The plot involves a one-armed lion tamer who reunites with his son.

Cast
 Wallace Beery as Windy O'Shaughnessy
 Jackie Cooper as Stubby O'Shaughnessy
 George "Spanky" McFarland as Stubby O'Shaughnessy (child)
 Henry Stephenson as Major Bigelow
 Sara Haden as Aunt Martha Shields (billed as Sarah Haden)
 Leona Maricle as Cora O'Shaughnessy
 Willard Robinson as Dan Hastings
 Clarence Muse as Jeff

References

External links
 
 
 
 

1935 films
1935 drama films
American black-and-white films
Films directed by Ryszard Bolesławski
Metro-Goldwyn-Mayer films
American drama films
Films with screenplays by Wanda Tuchock
1930s English-language films
1930s American films